The 1949 Australian Championships was a tennis tournament that took place on outdoor Grass courts at the Memorial Drive, Adelaide, Australia from 21 January to 31 January. It was the 37th edition of the Australian Championships (now known as the Australian Open), the 9th held in Adelaide, and the first Grand Slam tournament of the year.

During the Australian Championships, men's singles and doubles, women's singles and doubles and mixed doubles was played throughout the ten days. In the men's singles, 40 players participated in the tournament to try and claim the title from defending champion, Adrian Quist. After he fell in the quarter-finals, the men's final was played between fourth-seed Frank Sedgman and top seed John Bromwich with Sedgman taking out his first Grand Slam singles title winning in straight sets. In the women's, 30 players attempted to take the title from defending champion, Nancye Bolton. In the final it was between American and top-seeded player, Doris Hart and second seed Bolton with the American coming out on top in straight sets. Bolton and Bromwich would take out their respective doubles competitions with partners Adrian Quist and Thelma Coyne Long with Hart and Sedgman taking out the mixed doubles title.

Finals

Men's singles

 Frank Sedgman defeated  John Bromwich 6–3, 6–2, 6–2

Women's singles

 Doris Hart defeated  Nancye Wynne Bolton  6–3, 6–4

Men's doubles
 John Bromwich /  Adrian Quist defeated  Geoff Brown /  Bill Sidwell 6–8, 7–5, 6–2, 6–3

Women's doubles
 Thelma Coyne Long /  Nancye Wynne Bolton defeated  Doris Hart /  Marie Toomey 6–0, 6–1

Mixed doubles
 Doris Hart /  Frank Sedgman defeated  Joyce Fitch /  John Bromwich 6–1, 5–7, 12–10

References

External links
 Australian Open official website

1949
1949 in Australian tennis
January 1949 sports events in Australia